The Meaher–Zoghby House is a historic townhouse in Mobile, Alabama.  The two-story brick structure was built in 1901 for Augustine Meaher.  It retains its original cast iron details and front yard fence.  The house was added to the National Register of Historic Places on January 5, 1984.  In addition to being listed individually on the National Register of Historic Places, it is also a contributing building to the Lower Dauphin Street Historic District.

References

National Register of Historic Places in Mobile, Alabama
Houses on the National Register of Historic Places in Alabama
Houses in Mobile, Alabama
Houses completed in 1901